Ko Byung-wook (Hanja: 高竝旭; born 21 August 1992) is a South Korean football forward who plays for Jeonnam Dragons in K League.

Club career
Ko joined Incheon Korail in 2012 and made his league debut against Changwon FC on 20 July 2012.and he played 23 league games and scored 6 goals in Incheon Korail. he also won 2012 Korea National League.

In 2014, he signed with Gangneung FC and played 26 league games and scored 16 goals.

In 2015, he transferred to Jeonnam Dragons.

Club career statistics

References

1992 births
Living people
Association football forwards
South Korean footballers
Gangneung City FC players
Jeonnam Dragons players
K League 1 players
Korea National League players